Colonel Jone Baledrokadroka  is a former career soldier who joined the Army in 1981 and was commissioned after attending an Officers commissioning course in Fiji.  He was briefly the Acting Land Force Commander in January 2006.  He was dismissed from this position on 13 January 2006, after only two days in the post. He disagreed with the Commander on issues affecting the Military and attempted to shut out the Commander from the barracks. His attempt to rally the troops to his cause failed; they saw it as a coup attempt against the Commander and withheld their support for his actions. Baledrokadroka was dismissed as a result. Prior to his appointment as Acting Land Force Commander, Baledrokadroka had attended the Defence and Strategic Studies Course at the Australian Defence College, Canberra,in 2003.

Education
Baledrokadroka was educated at the Marist Brothers High School in Suva and De La Salle College, Māngere East, before attending Auckland University of Technology, where he studied civil engineering. He has a PhD in Politics from the ANU and other postgraduate qualifications in the defence and security fields.

Baledrokadroka's dismissal 

Baledrokadroka had disagreed with the Commander on matters related to the Military role in politics.

It was reported the next day that Baledrokadroka had been relieved of his command.  Fiji Live reported that he had been ordered to go on leave until further notice; Bainimarama himself had taken over the command, effective immediately. His dismissal was confirmed by Military spokesman Captain Neumi Leweni and by Baledrokadroka himself, who told Fiji Television that he was on leave, pending resignation.

Baledrokadroka's version 
Baledrokadroka told the Fiji Times on the 14th that he had resigned rather than obey an order of Bainimarama's.  "I deciphered it as being treasonous and I refused to obey it," he said.  Bainimarama telephoned him, he claimed, and told him that he was to be dismissed.  He initially refused to accept his dismissal, he claimed, until the charges against him were specified in writing.

This led to the crisis in the barracks on the morning of the 12th, he said.  He claimed to have confronted the Commander "It was perfectly clear that he was going to commit treason ... I told him it was either he resign or I resign" Baledrokadroka told the Fiji Times.

He denied claims by unnamed army sources that he had tried to stage a mutiny.  He also denied claims by Bainimarama that he had threatened to shoot the Commander.  "... I absolutely deny that I threatened violence against the Commander and I’m deeply shocked at the claim.

Bainimarama's version 
Fiji Village reported on 14 January that at a press conference held that afternoon, Commodore Bainimarama said that Baledrokadroka had been dismissed for insubordination and for failing the loyalty test of the Military. The command which Baledrokadroka had refused to obey had only been a test, which he had failed miserably, the Commander claimed.  He had been willing to give Baledrokadroka another chance, he said, but Baledrokadroka had made matters worse by talking to the media.  He accused Baledrokadroka of trying to elicit support from soldiers.  Accordingly, the Military had "isolated" Baledrokadroka in his office and the Military's legal team had reasoned with him to persuade him not to attempt a mutiny.  In a recent interview, Bainimarama had already told the Review magazine: "We will not allow our officers to sit on the fence anymore as they did in 2000."

Bainimarama was joined by military spokesman Captain Neumi Leweni, who revealed that Military Police were now investigating the circumstances surrounding the barracks crisis that led to Baledrokadroka's resignation, and a Board of Inquiry had been set up.

Also joining Bainimarama was Lieutenant Colonel Etueni Caucau, his legal adviser.  Baledrokadroka had "threatened" the Commander, Caucau told Fiji Live, and had been confined to his office by other senior officers to prevent him from carrying out his threat.  Baledrokadroka's claim to have outside support was what had prompted the closing and guarding of the barracks' gates, Caucau added.

Investigation 
On  03 Nov 2007 Jone Baledrokadroka and eleven others were arrested and charged in an alleged assassination plot against the interim Prime Minister, some of his Cabinet Ministers and RFMF Officers. Baledrokadroka was  cleared of all chargers on 24 Dec 2008 as the Director Public Prosecution office entered a Noli Prosequi due to insufficient evidence tendered by the Police and the Military.

Post-military career 
Since his dismissal from the Military, Baledrokadroka has pursued a doctorate in politics and an academic research position with the Coral Bell School of Asia Pacific Affairs at the Australian National University. He has continued to speak out against what he sees as the inordinate influence of the Military in Fijian politics. He attributes this, in part, to its role in United Nations peacekeeping operations, which, he says, have put the Fijian Military in a mediating role abroad and whetted their appetite for an interventionist role at home. In 2012, in the leadup to the general elections scheduled for 2014, the first since the 2006 coup, he expressed scepticism about whether the Military would allow the vote to be free and fair. "The path in this progress towards democracy has been fraught with allegations of continuing military oversight and interference in the constitution-making process," he wrote in an Australian National University journal. "And it is possible that the new Constitution, once it has been finalised by Bainimarama’s handpicked Constituent Assembly, might become a setback to democracy by spawning a military backed one-party state."

Family
Balerokadroka is the son of the late Ratu Alipate Baledrokadroka, a former Senator and Chief from northern Naitasiri Province, who held the title of Taukei ni Waluvu. His mother, Adi Silafaga Kamikamica comes from Nacokula, Lasakau, on Bau Island. The Sunday Star-Times, reported on 15 January 2006, that Baledrokadroka was the brother of Senator Adi Lagamu Vuiyasawa, the de facto wife of Ratu Inoke Takiveikata, the Qaranivalu (Paramount Chief) of Naitasiri Province.

Baledrokadroka's younger brother Ratu Jope Tini Rinabobo, also known as Paul Baledrokadroka, is a teacher at Kelston Boys' High School in New Zealand. He also attended Marist Brothers High School. Paul's daughter and Jone's niece is Erikana Pedersen, a former New Zealand netball international.

References 

Fijian chiefs
Fijian soldiers
Year of birth missing (living people)
Living people
People from Naitasiri Province
Fijian expatriates in Australia
People educated at Marist Brothers High School, Fiji
People educated at De La Salle College, Māngere East
Auckland University of Technology alumni
Australian National University alumni